Cryptosepalum elegans is a species of flowering plants in the family the Fabaceae. It is found in Angola.

References

External links
 Cryptosepalum elegans at Tropicos

elegans
Plants described in 1955
Flora of Angola